Badische Landesbühne  is a theatre in Bruchsal, Baden-Württemberg, Germany.

Theatres in Baden-Württemberg